Eain Met Yar Thi is a 2001 Burmese drama film, directed by Mee Pwar starring Dwe, Moht Moht Myint Aung and Eaindra Kyaw Zin.

Cast
Dwe as Thurikza
Moht Moht Myint Aung as Ingyin Nway
Eaindra Kyaw Zin as Ngwe Hnin Phyu
Aung Lwin as father of Thurikza
Saw Naing as U Saw Say Wah
Kin Kaung as Saw Thein Win
Aung Zaw as Thuria
Gandawin as May Thin Phyu
Ye Mon as Ko Thet
Nay Toe (Cameo)

References

2001 films
2000s Burmese-language films
Burmese drama films
Films shot in Myanmar
2001 drama films